The Mahindra Rodeo is one of the three scooters produced by Mahindra since 2009.

Mahindra Rodeo is a 125 cc gearless power scooter and incorporates technological and design input from Taiwan's SYM & Italy's Engines Engineering.
Rodeo is supplied with telescopic suspension.  The manufacturer has also included a tachometer and a digital console incorporating a trip meter, clock, and a USB mobile phone charger.

Rodeo RZ 
In June 2012, Mahindra two wheelers unveiled Rodeo RZ, a new model of Mahindra Rodeo having high ground clearance, advanced telescopic suspension, more mileage and many other features.

Rodeo UZO 
In August 2014, Mahindra two wheelers unveiled Rodeo UZO.

References 

Indian motor scooters
Motorcycles introduced in 2009